Jason De León is an anthropologist, a National Geographic Emerging Explorer (2013), and a MacArthur Foundation 2017 Fellow. He studies the migration from Latin America to the United States of clandestine migrants crossing the U.S.–Mexico border. De León is Professor of Anthropology and Chicana, Chicano, and Central American Studies at the University of California, Los Angeles and Director of the Undocumented Migration Project, a non-profit research/arts/education collective aimed at documenting and raising awareness about migration issues. Since 2009, he has traveled frequently to the Sonoran Desert in Arizona to collect artifacts left behind by migrants trying to gain access to the United States. His Undocumented Migration Project includes more than 9000 objects, some of which are on display at the Smithsonian's National Museum of American History in Washington D.C. From 2013 to 2017, he co-curated an exhibition of these artifacts and other materials collected by the Undocumented Migration Project in a show called State of Exception that was featured in multiple locations including the Museum of Contemporary Art in Detroit (MOCAD) and the New School in New York City. He is Head Curator of the global participatory exhibition Hostile Terrain 94 that will be installed in 130 locations on six continents in 2021.

De León is a Mexican-Filipino American Army brat who grew up largely in McAllen, Texas near the Mexican border in the Rio Grande Valley and Long Beach, California. His native language is English and he is also fluent in Spanish.

Outside of his academic work, he is a musician who has been involved in various bands and musical projects over the years. He hosted a television show on the Discovery Channel in 2011 called American Treasures.

Education 
De León is a graduate of Wilson High School in Long Beach, California. He received his BA in anthropology in 2001 from the University of California in Los Angeles, CA. He received his MA in 2004 anthropology from Pennsylvania State University, PA where he completed his thesis titled, “Aztec Salt Production in the Basin of Mexico: A Domestic Perspective. He received his PhD in anthropology in 2008 from Pennsylvania State University, where he completed his dissertation titled, "The Lithic Industries of San Lorenzo-Tenochtitlán: An Economic and Technological Study of Olmec Obsidian" on the many years he spent in Mexico excavating obsidian tool artifacts left by indigenous people thousands of years ago.

Academic positions 
De León is currently a Professor of Anthropology and Chicana/o and Central American Studies and is also Affiliate Faculty in the Latin American Institute at the University of California, Los Angeles, CA. From 2008 to 2010 he was a Lecturer in anthropology at the University of Washington. He taught at the University of Michigan from 2010 to 2019. His current research lab is located in the Cotsen Institute of Archaeology at UCLA. From 2013-2014 he was a Weatherhead scholar at the School for Advanced Research. He is currently President of the Board of Directors for the Colibrí Center for Human Rights.

Publications and awards 
De León has published a book and is currently working on two more including a book tentatively titled "Soldiers and Kings" that traces the lives of several Honduran smugglers moving migrants across Mexico. The book is under contract with Viking Books. He has 22 peer reviewed articles and book chapters, has been involved in dozens of museum works and exhibitions, and has been the recipient of numerous research grants, awards, fellowships and honors, including a 2017-2022 MacArthur Foundation Fellowship. He received the 2016 Margaret Mead Award for his book The Land of Open Graves: Living and Dying on the Migrant Trail, with photos by Michael Wells, which combines the use of ethnography, archaeology, linguistics, and forensic science to document the human consequences of US immigration policy. He is the author of the book The Land of Open Graves: Living and Dying on the Migrant Trail (University of California Press, 2015). The book received the 2016 Margaret Mead Award and the 2018 JI Staley Prize  and has received positive reviews in many media outlets including The New York Times. His scholarly articles have been published in American Anthropologist, Journal of Forensic Sciences, and Journal of Contemporary Archaeology.

Areas of interest and study 
De León’s self-described areas of interest and methods include undocumented migration and deportation, human smuggling, violence, materiality, archaeology of the contemporary, photo-ethnography, and forensic science. His work has been described as a multidisciplinary approach to Latin America to US migration and involves ethnographic analysis of migrant stories, forensic science, and archaeological research. It has also been described as an “intersection of physical geography, cultural geography, and archaeology,” as he uses tools like GPS to document sites. He says that archaeology is “studying the past through material traces." We tend to think these must be ancient things” and asks us to question, “What happens if you think about the archaeology of the recent past, as recently as this morning in some cases”?

Undocumented Migration Project (UMP) and Hostile Terrain 94 (HT94) 

As Executive Director of the long-term Undocumented Migration Project (UMP) Inc., a 501(c)(3) that began in 2009, De León uses fieldwork to “collect, catalogue, and interpret nearly 10,000 objects left in the desert by migrants making the treacherous, undocumented border crossing from Mexico into the United States” and says these objects become artifacts.

The UMP project has focused on the last 20 years, but broadened more recently in 2020 to include longer histories of migration, labor, and environmental changes centered on Arizona, which is a main area of undocumented crossings from Mexico; they will conduct interviews and collect oral histories.

As part of UMP, De León directs Hostile Terrain 94 (HT94), a participatory art project resulting in an exhibition of “3,200 handwritten toe tags that represent migrants who have died trying to cross the Sonoran Desert of Arizona between the mid-1990s and 2019. These tags are geolocated on a wall map of the desert showing the exact locations where remains were found”. HT94 was shown in the US and around the world, debuting a virtual exhibition on July 17, 2020. This exhibition is slated to be installed in 130 locations on six continents through the end of 2021.

References

External links 

 Undocumented Migration Project

American anthropologists
Living people
Year of birth missing (living people)
University of California, Los Angeles alumni
Pennsylvania State University alumni
University of Michigan faculty